The Australian women's national basketball team is nicknamed the Opals, after the brightly coloured gemstone common to the country. From 1994 onwards, the Opals have been consistently competitive and successful having won nine medals at official FIBA international tournaments (Olympics and World Cups), highlighted by a gold medal winning performance at the 2006 World Championship in Brazil. At the now-defunct regional Oceania Championship for Women, the Opals won 15 titles. Effective in 2017, FIBA combined its Oceanian and Asian zones for official senior competitions; following this change, the Opals compete in the FIBA Women's Asia Cup.

History

1950-60s: Beginnings
Basketball arrived in Melbourne in 1905, but the first major international women's tournament was the 1953 FIBA World Championships held in Chile.  Although the Opals did not qualify for the first tournament, they did, however, qualify for the 1957 Championships held in Brazil. Captained by Lorraine Eiler, the Opals defeated Cuba and Peru. Sixteen year-old Bronte Cockburn led the scoring for Australia with an average of 9.5 points per game, but the inexperienced team ultimately finished in 10th place. Since then, the Opals have helped increase the popularity of the sport in Australia. Australia would not get the opportunity to participate at the 1959 World Championship held in Moscow because at the time, the Australian Government would not allow the team to travel to the USSR. The Opals would not qualify for a World Championship again until the 1967 contest in Czechoslovakia.  With an entirely new team and a single victory over Italy, Australia finished in 10th position for the second time. Team captain, Jean Forster, led the scoring for Australia with an average of 21.2 points per game, with a tournament high of 34 against Brazil. Her 21.2 points per game would remain unchallenged for 35 years.

1970s: Early development
In 1971, the Opals travelled once again to Brazil.  Led by new head coach Merv Harris, and featuring Jill Hammond, the team made several improvements with only three players from the 1967 squad selected.  Although the Opals finished in ninth place, they had victories over Madagascar (twice), Argentina, Ecuador and Canada. In 1975, the team headed to Colombia with another new head coach, Jim Madigan.  Despite a 74–25 confidence building win over Senegal, as well as victories over Japan, Brazil and Hungary, the team finished in 10th place.

The 1976 Olympics held in Montreal marked the first Olympic medals awarded for women's basketball, but Opals did not qualify for the tournament.  Their next major competition would be the 1979 World Championships in South Korea, which would prove to be their first taste of success.  The coach again was Jim Madigan, and the squad featured some of the faces of the Opals for the next decade such as Jenny Cheesman, Robyn Maher, Julie Nykiel, Karin Maar and Patricia Mickan.  The team would have early success defeating Italy and France, as well as thrashing Malaysia 119–14.  Australia would lose their next three games, but bounced back winning their final game over Japan to finish in fourth place, their best international result to that time.

1980s: Into the Olympics
In the early days of women's Olympic basketball, only six countries competed in the tournament, and the host country received an automatic entry. Therefore, there were 22 countries competing for the remaining five spots in 1980 Olympics held in Moscow. In the preliminary tournament, the Opals fell to the USA and Hungary, and did not qualify for the Olympics.  Three years later, the team traveled to Brazil for the 1983 World Championships, looking to demonstrate that their 1979 success was no accident.  Despite an early victory over Japan, Australia failed to advance and finished in 11th place. The Opals were not expected to participate at the 1984 Olympic Games held in Los Angeles. However, following the decision by Cuba to boycott the games, the door was opened for the Opals to compete in their first ever Olympics. Led by head coach Brendan Flynn, and team captain Jenny Cheesman, the Opals played competitively in every game, but finished fifth out of the six teams.

The next tournament for the Opals was the 1986 World Championships in Moscow.  The first game against Hungary was a two overtime thriller that the Opals lost 79–77. The game set the tone for the tournament, and despite some close finishes against the top rated teams, Australia finished in ninth place. The Opals then headed into the 1988 Seoul Olympics with a medal hope, but they lost the first game to host nation Korea. The Opals bounced back and defeated Bulgaria, meaning that only the powerful Soviet Union stood between them and a semi-finals berth.  In a major upset, the Opals defeated the USSR 60–48, setting up a meeting against Yugoslavia.  In a memorable game, the Opals lost a closely contested game at the buzzer 57–56, sending them to a rematch with the USSR for the bronze medal.  Motivated by the previous loss, the USSR came out determined and outplayed the Opals 68–53.  Despite the loss, the fourth-place finish equalled the Opals’ previous best international placing.

1990s: Rise as an International force

Building from their success at Seoul, the Opals headed to Malaysia for the 1990 World Championships with high hopes.  The team won their first two games against Malaysia and Italy, before suffering a string of losses to Bulgaria, the Soviet Union, Yugoslavia and Czechoslovakia. In their final game, the Opals came back from seven-point halftime deficit to beat Bulgaria 73–71 and finish in sixth place. Fifteen teams competed for the five open spots at the 1992 Barcelona Olympics, and despite a respectable 4–2 record at the preliminary tournament, the Opals did not qualify.

Two years later, Australia played host to the 1994 FIBA World Championships. Led by guard Shelley Sandie's 11.9 points per game, the team scored victories over Japan, Italy, Slovakia and Canada to set up a semi-finals match against China.  The Opals held an early lead, but China mounted a second half comeback led by Haixia Zheng's 36 points, and Australia just lost by a single point 66–65. In the bronze medal game, Australia played the United States, and despite a small halftime lead, the Opals lost a close game 100–95. The loss however, resulted in a respectable fourth-place finish. The young 1994 team featured the backbone of Australian teams over the next decade; Rachael Sporn, Trisha Fallon, Michelle Brogan, Allison Tranquilli, Sandy Brondello, Annie La Fleur and Jenny Whittle. At the 1994 tournament, the team also adopted the Opals as its nickname.

At the 1996 Summer Olympics held in Atlanta, the Olympic tournament was expanded to twelve teams, making an easier path for Australia to qualify. Captained by Robyn Maher, the Opals started off with strong wins over South Korea, Zaire, and Cuba before losing to eventual gold medalist USA and Ukraine.  Australia then persevered through an overtime game against Russia to set up a semi-finals match against the United States.  The US won the game 93–71, sending the Opals to a rematch against Ukraine for the bronze medal.  Australia held back a second half comeback by Ukraine to win the game 66–56, earning Australia its first ever international basketball medal for either men or women.

In 1998, the Opals looked to build off the bronze medal at the World Championships in Germany.  The team featured 17-year-old future star Lauren Jackson, and was led by Michelle Brogan's average of 13.1 points per game. Australia put together a dominant performance, winning their first seven games before losing to Russia 82–76 in a close semi-final match. In the bronze medal game, Carla Boyd's 26 points proved too much for Brazil, and the Opals won 72–67 to earn their second bronze medal in international play.

2000s: A decade of medals and World Champions
With Sydney hosting the 2000 Olympic Games, the Opals gained automatic entry into the tournament. Captained by Michele Timms, the team started out with dominating performances winning all of their first seven games, sending them to their first ever gold medal match, against the USA. The American team proved too strong for the Opals however, as they won 76–54. Australia won the Silver Medal, their best result in international competition at the time. In 2002, the Opals looked to continue their success in China at the World Championships.  Coached by Jan Stirling, captained by Kristi Harrower, and powered by Lauren Jackson's 23.1 points per game (which led the tournament), Australia won its first five games all by double figures.  In the second round the Opals lost to Brazil, but bounced back with a 78–52 victory over France in the quarterfinal.  In the semi-finals, the Opals lost to eventual gold medalist USA, but recovered the next day to capture the bronze medal with a convincing 91–63 win over South Korea.

At the 2004 Olympics held in Athens, Greece, the Opals were led by Lauren Jackson's tournament best 22.9 points and 10 rebounds per game. With Penny Taylor contributing with 14.8 points per game, Australia dominated early winning their first seven games, all by double digits. The Opals set up a rematch of the 2000 Olympic gold medal match against the USA.  The United States outlasted the Opals in the fourth quarter to win 74–63, giving the Opals their second straight Olympic silver medal.

The Opals headed to Brazil for the 2006 World Championships looking to win their sixth straight medal in international competitions.  Led by Lauren Jackson's 21.3 points per game and Penny Taylor's 18 points per game, first and third best in the tournament respectively, the Opals played their best tournament to date.  Australia began the tournament with a forfeit victory over Lithuania. They continued the trend by winning their next seven games decisively, with only one contest being decided by less than 10 points. In the gold medal game against Russia, the Opals led throughout, paced by Penny Taylor's 28 points and Lauren Jackson's 11 rebounds.  At the final buzzer, the scoreboard read Australia 91, Russia 74; a convincing victory that delivered Australia's first ever basketball gold medal. Penny Taylor was named the Most Valuable Player of the tournament.

At the 2008 Beijing Olympics, the Opals looked to reaffirm their title as World Champions.  In the lead up, Australia went undefeated against Belarus, Brazil, South Korea, Latvia, Russia, Czech Republic and host China to set up a third straight gold medal match against the United States.  The Opals had trouble hitting the basket and shot just 24% en route to a 92–65 defeat.  The team earned their third straight Olympic silver medal, and their seventh straight international medal finish. The 2000s was a golden era for the Opals, winning at least a bronze medal at every official FIBA tournament.

2010s: Ushering a new era
In 2010, the 16th edition of the World Championship was held in the Czech Republic. Pre-tournament favourites Australia, USA, and Russia, dominated play in the first two rounds.  In the quarterfinals, however, Australia suffered a shock 79–68 loss to the Czech Republic. The loss meant that the Opals could not finish any higher than 5th place, its worst international result since the early 1990s.

Looking to rebound from their disappointing 2010 result, the Opals qualified for the 2012 Olympic Games in London by beating New Zealand three games to nil in the 2011 FIBA Oceania Championship. They finished the Olympic preliminary series with a 4 – 1 record, losing to France in game 2, but after Belinda Snell sank a well behind the half-court line 3-point shot with less than one second on the clock to send the game into overtime. Against Russia, Liz Cambage became the first woman in Olympic history to successfully slam dunk a basketball. In the quarterfinal against China, Lauren Jackson became the Olympic Games record holder for points scored, overtaking Brazilian legend Janeth Arcain's tally of 535 points. The Opals accounted for China 75–60 to set up a semi-final game with their long-time rivals USA. Despite holding a half-time lead, the Opals again fell short losing 86–73. The Opals would however, win their 5th consecutive Olympic medal with an 83–74 win over Russia to claim the bronze.

Leading up to the 2014 World Championship in Turkey, a number of long-serving players announced their retirements or declared themselves unavailable. Those players included Kristi Harrower, Jenni Screen, Kristen Veal, Abby Bishop, Kathleen MacLeod, Samantha Richards, Suzy Batkovic and Jenna O'Hea. Three weeks before the start of the tournament, Lauren Jackson withdrew from the team because of a knee injury. Two weeks later Liz Cambage ruptured her achilles tendon during a pre-tournament game and was ruled-out because of the injury. This resulted in the selection of seven debutants into the squad of 12, a move seen as ushering in a new era of Opals basketball. Despite the loss of veteran players, the Opals went through the preliminary rounds and quarter-final undefeated, setting up a semi-final clash with USA. In a hard-fought game, the Opals cut the lead from 16 points to just six early in the final quarter, before losing 82–70. The Opals would however claim their third bronze medal at world championships with a comfortable 74–44 win against host nation Turkey. Penny Taylor was named to the tournament All-Star Five.

The Opals qualified for the 2016 Olympics in Rio de Janeiro following a series win against New Zealand in August 2015. On 31 March 2016, Lauren Jackson announced her retirement from basketball, citing a chronic knee injury as the reason for her decision. The Olympic squad was announced on 12 July 2016 and included seven Olympic debutants and only three players from the 2012 squad. Notable exclusions included three-time Olympic medallist Suzy Batkovic, reigning WNBL MVP Abby Bishop and Rebecca Allen. Despite slow starts which had plagued Australia throughout the tournament, the Opals finished on top of their group with a 5–0 record, outscoring Japan 33–15 in the final quarter to win by six points. In the Quarter-final, the Opals suffered a shock 73–71 loss to Serbia, conceding 26 turnovers and eliminating them from medal contention. This ended a run of five successive Olympic medals dating back 20 years. One highlight was Liz Cambage breaking Lauren Jackson's Australian Olympic record of points scored in a single game with 37 against Japan. It was the third-highest haul by a woman in Olympic history and the highest in 28 years.

Following the early exit from the Rio Olympics, Brendan Joyce was replaced in April 2017 by former Opals player and Phoenix Mercury head coach, Sandy Brondello. Unlike previous years, the Opals qualified for the 2018 World Cup through the FIBA Women's Asia Cup held in India where they won a silver medal. Kelsey Griffin was named tournament most valuable player. With basketball returning to the Commonwealth Games for the first time since 2006, the Opals easily accounted for England in the final winning the gold-medal game 99–55. At the 2018 World Cup held in Spain, the Opals led their group with a 3–0 record. They then defeated China 83–42 in the quarter-final and Spain 72–66 in the semi-final to set up a gold-medal final with their long-time rivals USA. The Opals lost the game 73–56 with head coach Sandy Brondello stating a lack of offence proved their downfall. Liz Cambage led the tournament scoring with an average of 23.8 points per game and was named to the All-Star Five.

Competitive record

Olympic Games
Women's basketball was introduced as an Olympic sport at Montreal in 1976. From 1976 to 1992, only six countries (teams) participated in the Olympic tournament. However, in 1996 at Atlanta the tournament was expanded to twelve teams. Through the 2016 Olympics, Australia qualified for the Olympic Games through competing in the FIBA Oceania Basketball Championship held each four years in the year preceding the games. Typically, this tournament featured either a two or three-game series between Australia and New Zealand. With the Oceania Championship having been discontinued after its 2015 edition, and FIBA having removed all women's continental championships except for EuroBasket Women from the Olympic qualification process in 2017, Australia will qualify for future Olympics through a two-stage process, starting with an Olympic pre-qualifying tournament involving Asian and Oceanian national teams in the year before the Olympics and followed by a worldwide Olympic qualifying tournament held in the year of the Games.

World Cup
The first official Women's World Cup, known as the Women's World Championship through its 2014 edition, was held in Chile in 1953. The tournament was expanded to 16 countries (teams) in 1990. Since 2017, Australia qualifies for the World Cup through competing in the FIBA Women's Asia Cup, held each four years in the year preceding the Women's World Cup. Before then, Australia qualified through the FIBA Oceania Championship. Typically, this tournament featured either a two or three-game series between Australia and New Zealand. FIBA discontinued the Oceania championships for both women and men after their respective 2015 editions, combining FIBA Asia and FIBA Oceania into a single zone for purposes of World Cup and Olympic qualification.

Asia Cup
Commencing in 2017, teams from Oceania and Asia zones competed together for the first time ever with the top four finishing teams qualifying for the 2018 World Cup.

Statistics

Team

Current roster
Roster for the 2022 FIBA Women's Basketball World Cup.

Past World Cup squads

Past Olympics squads

International caps
The following is a chronological list of Australian players who have played at official senior FIBA international tournaments (Olympic Games and World Cups). The list includes both past and present players. Active players are shown in bold. Where two or more players debuted in the same series, their cap number is determined by their official uniform number (and not alphabetically). As of the 2020 Olympic Games, 112 players have represented Australia at Olympic Games and World Cups. There were no debutants at the 2000 Olympic Games in Sydney.

 Deceased

Individual achievements

Opals all-time games played

Legend
 Games played is current as at the completion of the London Olympic Games in August 2012.
 (*) denotes the player is a member of the Australian Basketball Hall of Fame.
 Italic denotes the player is still active.

Opals Team Captains

Legend
 Tournaments are those officially sanctioned by FIBA.

See also

Australia men's national basketball team
Australia women's national 3x3 team
Australia women's national under-17 basketball team
Australia women's national under-19 basketball team
Australia women's national wheelchair basketball team
Australian Basketball Hall of Fame
List of Australian WNBA players
List of Olympic medalists in basketball

References

External links

FIBA profile
AustraliaBasket.com – Australia Women Current Squad
Australia Basketball Records at FIBA Archive

 
Basketball
Women's national basketball teams